Mehul Shah is an American actor, director, writer, and producer of Indian origin.  He created his film production company, Kinetik Films right after he graduated from Southern Methodist University. His most notable works are Bollywood Beats, Nana's Secret Recipe, Explore Vegan ATX, and his co-starring role on Season 3 of the television series Homeland.

Career
Mehul Shah began his love of performing and film at a very early age. After majoring in cinema in school, he decided to write and direct his first film, Diwali, which was an independent feature shot in Dallas. The story deals with three 20 something siblings, Anjali, Mihir, and Priti, who come back home during Diwali, the Indian New Year, and are forced to confront secrets that they are keeping from their families.

He then went on to write and direct a dance-comedy film titled Bollywood Beats, which starred Lillete Dubey, Pooja Kumar, Sachin Bhatt, and Sarita Joshi.  He continued to produce films under his company, co-producing with SMU alum Wade McDonald on his film Hold Your Peace, as well as working on a documentary about hip-hop music in Dallas titled Tha Bridge, and producing the feature film Bug starring Gene Jones (actor).

His recent film Nana's Secret Recipe, was shot in Austin, Texas and is currently available on Amazon Prime, Tubi, and IMDBtv.

Mehul has also done commercial and print work for Dell, Comerica Bank, The Texas State Lottery, Chuck E. Cheese, Nokia, MTV India, J. C. Penney, and Motorola.

He is represented by Collier Talent.

Filmography

References

External links
 

Living people
American Jains
Male models from Texas
American male actors of Indian descent
21st-century Indian male actors
Year of birth missing (living people)